Nicole Gordon may refer to:

 Nicole Gordon (Pretty Little Liars)
 Nicole Gordon (badminton) (born 1976), badminton player from New Zealand
Nicole Gordon, fictional character played by Nafessa Williams